Lechuza (Spanish "barn owl") is the second studio album by American pop punk band Fenix TX, released on May 22, 2001, by MCA and Drive-Thru Records. Between June and August, the group performed on the Warped Tour.

The first song, "Phoebe Cates", is a first-person tale of falling in lust with actress Phoebe Cates. It includes a bridge with the lines "Looking for a fast time / Watching out for bright lights / Send me off to private school / When I'm with you it's paradise", all of which are references to films starring Cates (Fast Times at Ridgemont High, Bright Lights, Big City, Private School and Paradise, respectively).

On both the UK and the Japanese issue of the album, two bonus tracks are added — an updated rendition the Spanish Christmas song "Feliz Navidad" and the group's 2000 single "All My Fault" from Fenix TX. The hidden track "James' Song" is placed at the end of the second bonus track, thus shortening the length of track 11 on these issues to 5:34.

Reception 

The album was included at number 33 on Rock Sounds "The 51 Most Essential Pop Punk Albums of All Time" list. The album has sold 600,000 copies to date.

Track listing 
All tracks written by Fenix TX.

"Phoebe Cates" – 3:40
"Katie W." – 3:34
"Threesome" – 2:33
"Something Bad Is Gonna Happen" – 3:34
"Tearjerker" – 3:44
"Pasture of Muppets" – 3:00
"A Song for Everyone" – 4:08
"Manufactured Inspirato" – 2:51
"Beating a Dead Horse" – 3:16
"Abba Zabba" – 4:01
"El Borracho" – 17:36
Hidden track "James' Song" appears 13 minutes and 47 seconds into the last track.

Bonus tracks
"Feliz Navidad" – 3:02
"All My Fault" – 14:56

Personnel
Fenix TX
 William Salazar – lead vocals, guitar
 Damon DeLaPaz – drums, guitar, background vocals
 Adam Lewis – bass, background vocals
 James Love – guitar

Additional personnel
 Roddy Bottum – keyboards
 Dennis Hill – additional guitar, background vocals

References 
Citations

Sources

 

2001 albums
Fenix TX albums
Drive-Thru Records albums
MCA Records albums